Who Laughs Last, Laughs Best is a 1971 West German musical comedy film directed by Harald Reinl and starring Roy Black, Uschi Glas, and Theo Lingen.

Cast

References

External links

1970s musical comedy films
German musical comedy films
West German films
Films directed by Harald Reinl
Films set in hotels
Gloria Film films
1971 comedy films
1970s German films
1970s German-language films